Saragossa is an unincorporated community in Walker County, Alabama, United States.

History
Saragossa is likely named for the Zaragoza province of Spain. A post office operated under the name Saragossa from 1890 to 1967.

Notes

Unincorporated communities in Walker County, Alabama
Unincorporated communities in Alabama